Drymus or Drymos was a fortress in ancient Attica.

The site of Drymus is unlocated but near the border of Boeotia.

References

Populated places in ancient Attica
Former populated places in Greece
Lost ancient cities and towns